The Mother of God of Trakai is a Roman Catholic icon, located in the main altarpiece of the St. Mary Church in  Trakai, Lithuania.

Pope Clement XI sent  Bishop Konstanty Kazimierz Brzostowski for the canonical coronation of the venerated image on 4 September 1718.

Analysis 
The icon was painted in the middle of the 15th century and partially repainted in the early 17th century. However, according to legend, it was a gift from the Byzantine Emperor Manuel II Palaiologos to Grand Duke Vytautas on the occasion of his baptism.

Stefan Czarniecki, King Jan Kazimierz and Jan III Sobieski prayed before the icon.

Description 

The icon depicts the Virgin Mary, with her right hand supporting baby Jesus sitting on her lap, while her left holds a branch with three flowers.

Gothic and Renaissance elements are visible in the icon. It combines old with new iconography, inspired by European art forms.

The icon, which Lithuanian researchers believe is from Belarus, is determined by a bright light color, soft shapes and the specificity of facial features. The depiction of individual traits is so specific, and the sensitivity of the living body texture is so sincere, that the image is more like a portrait than an icon.

Sources 
 Гісторыя беларускага мастацтва: У 6 т. Т. 1: Ад старажытных часоў да другой паловы XVI cт. ; [рэд. кал.: С. В. Марцэлеў (гал.рэд.) [і інш.] ; рэд. тома С. В. Марцэлеў, Л. М. Дробаў ; АН БССР, Ін-т мастацтвазнаўства, этнаграфіі і фальклору. — Мінск : Навука і тэхніка, 1987. — 303 с. : iл.
 Przewodnik po sanktuariach maryjnych. Z dawna Polski tyś Królową, Szymanów 1996.
 A. Dylewski, M. Masłowski, B. Piotrowski, J. Swajdo, P. Wójcik: Litwa, Łotwa, Estonia i obwód kaliningradzki. Praktyczny przewodnik. Bielsko-Biała: Pascal, 2008. .

Paintings of the Madonna and Child
Catholic Church in Lithuania
Paintings in Lithuania
Lithuanian paintings